Pristimantis chloronotus is a species of frog in the family Strabomantidae.

It is found in Colombia and Ecuador. Its natural habitats are tropical moist montane forests, high-altitude shrubland, and high-altitude grassland. It is threatened by habitat loss.

References

chloronotus
Amphibians of the Andes
Amphibians of Colombia
Amphibians of Ecuador
Amphibians described in 1969
Taxonomy articles created by Polbot